Pagli may refer to:

Linda Pagli, Italian computer scientist 
Pagli (film), a 1943 Bollywood film
Pagli (TV series)